We're Up To No Good, We're Up To No Good, is Rory's 2006 One Eleven Records debut. The album was produced by Mark Hoppus (lead singer/bassist of blink-182 and +44) and John Avila (former bassist of Oingo Boingo).

Reception
"(Rory's new album is) all the best parts of the first Taking Back Sunday record mixed with all the best parts of the first Brand New record." Alternative Press 11/06 

"The raw ambition and ultimately the fun factor of We're Up To No Good, We're Up To No Good rank it up there with my favorite CDs of 2006." - Tony Pascarella of Absolutepunk.net

Track listing
"The State of How" – 1:39
"Typical" – 3:53
"Kind of Like Chloroformity (Cheers to Another One)" – 3:28
"Deja Vrooomier" – 4:02
"Doin' Lines of Conga"
"Tonight I Just Don't Care, I'm Having A Candy Dinner" – 3:46
"Nice Planet. We'll Take It." – 3:29
"Your Will or Whatever" – 4:01
"The Adventures of Me & Me (Starring Me & Me)" – 3:41
"It's On, Señor...¡GO!" – 3:50 
"Hey Pt. 1, 2 & 4" – 5:11
"Everybody Stabbed Me and It Didn't Even Hurt" – 15:21

References

Rory (band) albums
2006 albums
Albums produced by John Avila
Albums produced by Mark Hoppus